Chelmsford City Council in Essex, England is elected every four years. Since the last boundary changes in 2003 57 councillors have been elected from 24 wards.

Political control
Since the foundation of the council in 1973 political control of the council has been held by the following parties:

Leadership
The leaders of the council since 2003 have been:

Council elections
1973 Chelmsford District Council election
1976 Chelmsford District Council election (New ward boundaries)
1979 Chelmsford Borough Council election
1983 Chelmsford Borough Council election
1987 Chelmsford Borough Council election (New ward boundaries & borough boundary changes also took place)
1991 Chelmsford Borough Council election
1995 Chelmsford Borough Council election
1999 Chelmsford Borough Council election
2003 Chelmsford Borough Council election (New ward boundaries increased the number of seats by 1)
2007 Chelmsford Borough Council election
2011 Chelmsford Borough Council election
2015 Chelmsford City Council election
2019 Chelmsford City Council election

By-election results

1999–2003

2003–2007

2007–2011

Notes

References

By-election results

External links
Chelmsford City Council

 
Council elections in Essex
District council elections in England